Eysturtindur is the second highest point - 714 m - on the island of Vágoy, Faroe Islands.

References

Mountains of the Faroe Islands